Murattu Karangal  is a 1986 Indian Tamil-language Western film written and directed by Rajasekhar. The film stars Thiagarajan and Sulakshana, with Sathyaraj, Jaishankar, Ravichandran and Bhanu Chander in supporting roles. It was released on 10 January 1986.

Plot

Cast 
 Thiagarajan as Veeran
 Sathyaraj as Kabali
 Sulakshana as Valli
 Jaishankar as Kaali
 Ravichandran as Muthu
 Bhanu Chander as Maari
 Sivachandran as Rahman
 Chalapathi Rao as Kabali's sidekick

Soundtrack 
The music was composed by Ilaiyaraaja.

Reception 
Jayamanmadhan of Kalki panned the film, saying the cinematography was its only redeeming feature.

References

External links 
 

1980s Tamil-language films
1986 films
1986 Western (genre) films
Fiction about mind control
Films directed by Rajasekhar (director)
Films scored by Ilaiyaraaja
Indian Western (genre) films